ADC may refer to:

Science and medicine
 ADC (gene), a human gene
 AIDS dementia complex, neurological disorder associated with HIV and AIDS
 Allyl diglycol carbonate or CR-39, a polymer
 Antibody-drug conjugate, a type of anticancer treatment
 Apparent diffusion coefficient, a derived value from a diffusion MRI
 Automated dispensing cabinet, a computerized drug storage device for hospitals
 Azodicarbonamide, a blowing agent

Organisations

Arts
 ADC Theatre, venue of the University of Cambridge Amateur Dramatic Club 
 Art Directors Club of New York, a professional association
 Australian Dance Council, a national dance advocacy organisation
 Hong Kong Arts Development Council, a statutory body in Hong Kong

Aviation
 ADC Aircraft, a British firm established in 1920
 ADC Airlines, based in Ikeja, Nigeria
 Aerospace Defense Command, of the U.S. Air Force

Government and politics
 Aboriginal Development Commission, an Australian statutory body that existed from 1980 to 1990
 African Democratic Congress, a political party in Nigeria
 Alliance for Democratic Change, a political party in Tanzania
 American Deserters Committee, an anti-Vietnam War group
 American-Arab Anti-Discrimination Committee, a civil rights organization
 Arizona Department of Corrections, US
 Arkansas Department of Correction, US
 Ashfield District Council, Nottinghamshire, England
 Asociación Democrática de Colima, a political party from the State of Colima, Mexico

Others
 Acadia Divinity College, a seminary on the campus of Acadia University, Canada
 Advanced Digital Corporation, a defunct computer company of Southern California
 ADC Map, an American map publisher
 ADC Telecommunications, in Eden Prairie, Minnesota
 Australian Defence College, Weston Creek, Canberra

Technology
 Advanced Data Connector, a Microsoft technology
 Advanced Direct Connect, a peer-to-peer file sharing and chat protocol
 Air data computer, an essential avionics component found in modern glass cockpits
 Analog-to-digital converter, a type of electronic circuit
 Android Developer Challenge, a competition
 Apple Developer Connection, Apple Computer's developer network
 Apple Display Connector, similar to the DVI connector
 Application delivery controller, for accelerating website performance
 Automatic Data Capture, for automatic identification, data collection and storage into computer systems

Other uses
 Adlington (Cheshire) railway station, UK (National Rail code)
 Aid to Dependent Children, an American government social program from 1935 to 1960
 Aide-de-camp, assistant to a senior military or government person
 Alternative Daily cover, material other than soil for containment in a landfill
 Andakombe Airport, airport in Papua New Guinea (IATA: ADC)
 Andrew Dice Clay (born 1957), American comedian
 A.DC., taxonomic author abbreviation for Alphonse Pyramus de Candolle (1806–1893), French-Swiss botanist
 Axiom of dependent choice